Jazz Café Suite is a live album by ProjeKct One, one of the four sub-groups known as ProjeKcts into which the band King Crimson 'fraKctalised' from 1997 to 1999. The album was released by Discipline Global Mobile records in 2003.

The album was recorded at The Jazz Café in Camden Town, London between December 1 and December 4, 1997. All of the tracks featured on this disc consist of group improvisations, spliced together from different performances. Liner notes were written by Tony Levin, merchandiser Sid Smith, sound engineer David Singleton, and roadie Alex R. Mundy.

Track listing
"Suite One" (Robert Fripp, Bill Bruford, Tony Levin, Trey Gunn) – 29:02
"Suite Two" (Fripp, Bruford, Levin, Gunn) – 15:13
"Suite Three" (Fripp, Bruford, Levin, Gunn) – 6:25

Personnel
Robert Fripp – guitar
Trey Gunn – Warr guitar
Tony Levin – bass guitar, Chapman stick, synthesizer
Bill Bruford – drums, percussion

References

ProjeKcts
2003 live albums
King Crimson Collector's Club albums